John A. Pawk (December 23, 1910 – December 28, 2004) was an American professional basketball player. He played for the Warren Penns and Cleveland White Horses in the National Basketball League and averaged 4.1 points per game. His younger brother was Steve Pawk, who also played professional basketball.

In his post-basketball career, Pawk worked at the Lyndora Hotel for 40 years. He was also the uncle of Tony Award-winning singer and actress Michele Pawk.

References

1910 births
2004 deaths
American men's basketball players
Basketball players from Pennsylvania
Cleveland White Horses players
Forwards (basketball)
People from Butler, Pennsylvania
Warren Penns players
Westminster Titans men's basketball players